Aklavik/Freddie Carmichael Airport  is located adjacent to Aklavik, Northwest Territories, Canada. The aerodrome is built on the banks of the Peel Channel of the Mackenzie River delta. Aklavik was the regional centre but was prone to flooding.

In 1959, Inuvik was purposely built to house a larger airport, highway connections, new health facilities, housing and an innovative public utilidor system. Aklavik remains a small traditional village that retains its connections to the land and river.

Airlines and destinations

See also
Aklavik Water Aerodrome

References

External links

Airports in the Arctic
Certified airports in the Inuvik Region